The 2008 Houston Texans season was the franchise's 7th season in the National Football League and the 3rd under head coach Gary Kubiak.  Though the Texans lost their first four games of the season, they rallied and won five of their last six games, to finish with an 8–8 record for the second consecutive year.

The 2008 season also marked the Texans' first appearance on Monday Night Football.

Offseason

Coaching changes
Head coach Gary Kubiak entered his third year with the Texans. Alex Gibbs, who implemented his successful zone blocking scheme with the Denver Broncos and the Atlanta Falcons joined the staff as the assistant head coach, replacing Mike Sherman, who left to become the head coach at Texas A&M. Kyle Shanahan, son of Broncos coach Mike Shanahan, took over as the offensive coordinator in place of Sherman.

Player additions/subtractions
Additions:
LB Kevin Bentley
RB Chris Brown
SS Nick Ferguson
QB Quinn Gray (Released before regular season)
C Chris Myers
CB Jacques Reeves
LB Chaun Thompson
LB Rosevelt Colvin (Released before regular season)

Subtractions:
 LB Charlie Anderson
 SS Michael Boulware
 LB Danny Clark
 DB Von Hutchins
 WR Jerome Mathis
 TE Jeb Putzier
 C Mike Flanagan
 C Steve McKinney
 LB Shawn Barber
 OT Jordan Black

Draft

The Texans had seven selections in the 2008 NFL Draft. The Texans originally had five before the draft after having traded their second round selection to the Atlanta Falcons to land quarterback Matt Schaub and their sixth-round pick to the Denver Broncos for center Chris Myers. The Texans traded their first-round pick with the Baltimore Ravens for their third and sixth-round selections along with their first-round pick.

Staff

Roster

Schedule

Preseason

Regular season

Note: Intra-division opponents are in bold text.

Standings

Regular season results

Week 1: at Pittsburgh Steelers

The Texans began their 2008 campaign on the road against the Pittsburgh Steelers.  In the first quarter, Houston trailed early as Steelers RB Willie Parker got a 7-yard TD run.  In the second quarter, the Texans continued to trail as Parker got a 13-yard TD run, while QB Ben Roethlisberger completed a 13-yard TD pass to WR Hines Ward.  Houston ended the half with kicker Kris Brown getting a 34-yard field goal.  In the third quarter, the Texans continued to trail as Parker got a 4-yard TD run, while Roethlisberger and Ward hooked up with each other again on a 16-yard TD pass.  In the fourth quarter, Houston replied with QB Matt Schaub completing a 14-yard TD pass to WR Kevin Walter.  Pittsburgh responded with kicker Jeff Reed nailing a 44-yard field goal.  The Texans closed out the scoring with a game with a 4-yard TD run by Schaub.

With the loss, Houston began its season at 0–1.

Week 2: Bye Week
The Texans were originally scheduled to play the Baltimore Ravens in Week 2, but due to structural damage to Reliant Stadium by Hurricane Ike, the game was postponed until Week 10.  This allowed both Houston and Baltimore to take their bye week.

Week 3: at Tennessee Titans

Coming off their unexpected bye week, the Texans flew to LP Field for a Week 3 AFC South duel with the Tennessee Titans.  In the first quarter, Houston struck first with kicker Kris Brown getting a 44-yard field goal.  The Titans responded with RB LenDale White getting a 2-yard TD run.  The Texans answered with Brown kicking a 24-yard field goal.  In the second quarter, Tennessee increased its lead with QB Kerry Collins completing a 9-yard TD pass to TE Bo Scaife.  The Texans answered with rookie RB Steve Slaton getting a 6-yard TD run, but the PAT failed.  The Titans closed out the first half scoring with White's 1-yard TD run.

In the third quarter, Tennessee added onto its lead with kicker Rob Bironas nailing a 44-yard field goal.  In the fourth quarter, the Titans sealed the win with CB Cortland Finnegan returning an interception 99 yards for a touchdown.

With the loss, Houston fell to 0–2.

Week 4: at Jacksonville Jaguars

Still searching for their first win of the year, the Texans flew to Jacksonville Municipal Stadium for a Week 4 AFC South duel with the Jacksonville Jaguars.  In the first quarter, Houston trailed early as Jaguars FB Montell Owens took a fake punt and ran 41 yards for a touchdown.  The Texans got on the board with kicker Kris Brown getting a 27-yard field goal.  In the second quarter, Houston took the lead as QB Matt Schaub completed a 30-yard TD pass to rookie RB Steve Slaton.  Jacksonville ended the half with kicker Josh Scobee getting a 46-yard field goal.

In the third quarter, the Jaguars retook the lead with QB David Garrard completing a 16-yard TD pass to WR Matt Jones.  The Texans tied the game with Schaub completing a 5-yard TD pass to WR Kevin Walter.  In the fourth quarter, Jacksonville responded with Scobee's 40-yard field goal.  Houston retook the lead with Schaub hooking up with Walter again on an 8-yard TD pass.  However, the Jaguars got the lead again as Garrard got a 5-yard TD run.  The Texans tied game on Brown's 47-yard field goal.  However, in overtime, Jacksonville sealed Houston's fate as Scobee nailed the game-winning 37-yard field goal.

With the loss, the Texans fell to 0–3.

Week 5: vs. Indianapolis Colts

Hoping to rebound from their divisional road loss to the Jaguars, the Texans finally got to play their home opener as they played a Week 5 AFC South duel with the Indianapolis Colts.  Due to an illness, QB Matt Schaub was unable to play, allowing backup QB Sage Rosenfels to get the start.

In the first quarter, Houston trailed early as Colts kicker Adam Vinatieri got a 46-yard field goal, along with RB Joseph Addai getting a 1-yard TD run.  In the second quarter, the Texans responded with rookie RB Steve Slaton getting a 1-yard TD run, kicker Kris Brown getting a 37-yard field goal, and Rosenfels completing a 5-yard TD pass to WR Andre Johnson.  In the third quarter, Houston increased its lead with Brown nailing a 43-yard field goal.  In the fourth quarter, the Texans continued its run with Slaton getting a 1-yard TD run, expanding their lead to 17 points.  What followed went into the NFL history books, as Sage Rosenfels fumbled twice and threw two interceptions to blow the biggest lead inside of 5 minutes in NFL history. The key play was known as the 'Rosencopter' play, when on third-and-eight, Rosenfels opted to try to hurdle a defender rather than sliding short of the first down. Gary Brackett recovered the fumble for a 58-yard touchdown, and Rosenfels was never the same afterwards, turning the ball over twice more. With the disappointing loss, Houston fell to 0–4.

Week 6: vs. Miami Dolphins

Coming off a heartbreaking home loss to the Colts, the Texans stayed at home for a Week 6 duel with the Miami Dolphins.  In the first quarter, Houston trailed early as Dolphins QB Chad Pennington completed a 53-yard TD pass to RB Patrick Cobbs.  The Texans responded with kicker Kris Brown getting a 27-yard field goal.  In the second quarter, Miami added onto its lead as Pennington completed an 80-yard TD pass to Cobbs.  Houston answered with Brown kicking a 33-yard field goal and WR Jacoby Jones returning a punt 70 yards for a touchdown.

In the third quarter, the Texans took the lead with QB Matt Schaub completing a 12-yar TD pass to WR Andre Johnson, but the Dolphins replied with RB Ricky Williams getting a 5-yard TD run.  In the fourth quarter, Houston regained the lead as Brown got a 42-yard field goal, yet Miami struck back RB Ronnie Brown got a 6-yard TD run.  The Texans got the last laugh as Schaub got the game-winning 3-yard TD run (with a failed 2-point conversion).

With the thrilling win, Houston won its first game of the season and improved to 1–4.

Week 7: vs. Detroit Lions

Coming off their last-second win over the Dolphins, the Texans continued their home stand with a Week 7 interconference duel with the winless Detroit Lions.  In the first quarter, Houston drew first blood as QB Matt Schaub completed a 2-yard TD pass to TE Owen Daniels, along with RB Ahman Green getting a 1-yard TD run.  In the second quarter, the Texans increased their lead as rookie RB Steve Slaton got a 1-yard TD run.  The Lions responded with kicker Jason Hanson getting a 54-yard field goal.

In the third quarter, Detroit tried to catch up as RB Kevin Smith got a 26-yard TD run.  Houston answered with Schaub hooking up with Daniels again on a 1-yard TD pass.  In the fourth quarter, the Lions tried to rally as QB Dan Orlovsky completed a 96-yard TD pass to WR Calvin Johnson, along with Hanson nailing a 54-yard field goal.  The Texans' defense stiffened for the victory.

With the win, Houston improved to 2–4.

Week 8: vs. Cincinnati Bengals

Coming off their win over the Lions, the Texans closed out their four-game home stand against the winless Cincinnati Bengals. In the first quarter, Houston drew first blood as WR Jacoby Jones returned a punt 73 yards for a touchdown.  The Bengals responded with kicker Shayne Graham getting a 43-yard field goal.  The Texans increased their lead as QB Matt Schaub completed a 6-yard TD pass to WR David Anderson.  Cincinnati closed out the half as Graham nailed a 32-yard field goal.

In the third quarter, Houston began to pull away as Schaub completed a 7-yard and a 39-yard TD pass to WR Kevin Walter.  In the fourth quarter, the Texans closed out their home stand in style with rookie RB Steve Slaton getting a 20-yard TD run.

With the win, not only did Houston improve to 3–4, but they won three straight games for the first time in franchise history.

Week 9: at Minnesota Vikings

Coming off their home win over the Bengals, the Texans flew to the Hubert H. Humphrey Metrodome for a Week 9 interconference duel with the Minnesota Vikings.  In the first quarter, Houston trailed early as Vikings RB Adrian Peterson got a 1-yard TD run.  The Texans responded with CB Jacques Reeves returning an interception 44 yards for a touchdown.  In the second quarter, Minnesota answered with QB Gus Frerotte completing an 8-yard TD pass to WR Sidney Rice and a 49-yard TD pass to WR Bernard Berrian.

In the third quarter, Houston tried to rally as QB Sage Rosenfels completed a 3-yard TD pass to WR David Anderson.  In the fourth quarter, the Vikings replied with Frerotte completing a 25-yard TD pass to TE Visanthe Shiancoe.  The Texans tried to come back as Rosenfels completed a 14-yard TD pass to WR Andre Johnson.  However, the Vikings' defense stiffened for the win.

With the loss, Houston fell to 3–5.

QB Matt Schaub (21/29 for 224 yards and 1 interception), who started the game, left after the first half with a sprained left knee.

Week 10: vs. Baltimore Ravens

Hoping to rebound from their road loss to the Vikings, the Texans went home for a Week 10 duel with the Baltimore Ravens.  Both teams were supposed to play each other in Week 2, but Hurricane Ike forced them to reschedule their game to this week.

With QB Matt Schaub out with an injury, back-up QB Sage Rosenfels was given the start.

In the first quarter, Houston trailed early as Ravens QB Joe Flacco completed a 43-yard TD pass to WR Yamon Figurs.  In the second quarter, the Texans responded with kicker Kris Brown getting a 23-yard field goal.  Baltimore answered on a Houston blunder, as rookie OT Duane Brown committed a holding penalty in his own end zone, giving the Ravens a safety.  Baltimore added onto their lead as kicker Steven Hauschka got a 54-yard field goal.  The Texans closed out the half with Brown nailing a 48-yard field goal.

In the third quarter, the Ravens increased their lead as RB Willis McGahee got a 1-yard TD run.  Houston responded as Rosenfels completed a 60-yard TD pass to WR Kevin Walter.  However, in the fourth quarter, Baltimore greatly pulled away as Flacco completed a 1-yard TD pass to TE Todd Heap (with a 2-point conversion pass to WR Derrick Mason), QB Troy Smith completed a 14-yard TD pass to Heap, and McGahee getting a 4-yard TD run.

With the loss, the Texans fell to 3–6.

Week 11: at Indianapolis Colts

Trying to snap a two-game losing streak and avenge their Week 5 collapse, the Texans flew to Lucas Oil Stadium for a Week 11 AFC South rematch with the Indianapolis Colts.  In the first quarter, Houston struck first as kicker Kris Brown got a 28-yard field goal.  The Colts responded with kicker Adam Vinatieri getting a 40-yard field goal.  The Texans answered with Brown making a 34-yard field goal.  In the second quarter, Indianapolis tied the game with Vinatieri getting a 39-yard field goal.  Houston replied with RB Ahman Green getting a 1-yard TD run.  The Colts closed out the half with Vinatieri making a 32-yard field goal.

In the third quarter, Indianapolis got the lead as QB Peyton Manning completed a 23-yard TD pass to RB Joseph Addai.  The Texans regained the lead as rookie RB Steve Slaton getting a 71-yard TD run.  The Colts answered with Addai getting a 7-yard TD run.  In the fourth quarter, Indianapolis increased their lead as Manning completed a 10-yard TD pass to WR Marvin Harrison.  Houston tried to come back as Green got a 2-yard TD run, but the Colts pulled away as Vinatieri nailed a 31-yard field goal.

With the loss, the Texans fell to 3–7.

Week 12: at Cleveland Browns

Trying to snap a three-game losing streak, the Texans flew to Cleveland Browns Stadium for a Week 12 duel with the Cleveland Browns.  In the first quarter, Houston drew first blood as QB Sage Rosenfels completed a 17-yard TD pass to WR Kevin Walter.  In the second quarter, the Texans increased their lead as kicker Kris Brown got a 31-yard field goal.  The Browns responded with kicker Phil Dawson getting a pair of 32-yard field goals.  Houston ended the half with Brown making a 31-yard field goal.  In the third quarter, the Texans continued their dominance as Brown nailed a 36-yard field goal.  From there on out, Houston's defense kept Cleveland's offense in check.

With the win, not only did the Texans improve to 4–7, but they finally got their first road win of the season.

Week 13: vs. Jacksonville Jaguars

Coming off their road win over the Browns, the Texans went home, donned their "Battle Red" uniforms, and played in their very first Monday Night Football game in franchise history, as they played a Week 13 AFC South rematch with the Jacksonville Jaguars.

In the first quarter, Houston drew first blood as QB Sage Rosenfels completed a 31-yard TD pass to WR Andre Johnson, while kicker Kris Brown got a 38-yard field goal.  After a scoreless second quarter, the Texans increased their lead early in the third quarter as Brown got a 50-yard field goal.  The Jaguars responded with kicker Josh Scobee getting a 29-yard field goal, yet Houston answered with Brown nailing a 20-yard field goal.  In the fourth quarter, Houston began to pull away as rookie RB Steve Slaton got a 7-yard TD run.  Jacksonville answered with RB Fred Taylor getting a 4-yard TD run, yet the Texans immediately replied as Slaton got a 40-yard TD run.  The Jaguars close out the scoring with QB David Garrard completing an 18-yard TD pass to WR Reggie Williams.

With the win, Houston improved to 5–7.

This was the first time that Houston hosted a football game on Monday night in 14 years.  The last Monday night game that was held in Houston was on November 21, 1994, in the Houston Astrodome when the Houston Oilers were defeated by the New York Giants 13–10.

Week 14: at Green Bay Packers

With their MNF home win over the Jaguars fresh in their minds, the Texans flew to Lambeau Field for a Week 14 interconference duel with the Green Bay Packers.  Houston shot early in the first quarter as QB Matt Schaub completed a 58-yard TD pass to wide receiver Kevin Walter.  The Packers responded in the second quarter with QB Aaron Rodgers completing a 20-yard touchdown pass to TE Donald Lee, yet the Texans closed out the half with a 30-yard field goal from kicker Kris Brown.

Houston got the third quarter's only points as Brown got a 41-yard field goal.  Green Bay answered in the fourth quarter as RB Ryan Grant got a 6-yard touchdown run, yet the Texans replied with Schaub completing an 11-yard touchdown pass and a 2-point conversion pass to wide receiver Andre Johnson.  The Packers tied the game as Rodgers completed a 9-yard touchdown pass to wide receiver Jordy Nelson. Houston got the last laugh as Brown nailed the game-winning 40-yard field goal.

With the win, the Texans improved to 6–7.

Week 15: vs. Tennessee Titans

With the win, not only the Texans improved to 7–7. but they won four straight games for the first time in franchise history.

Week 16: at Oakland Raiders

Coming off their divisional upset win at home over the Titans, the Texans flew to Oakland–Alameda County Coliseum for a Week 16 duel with the Oakland Raiders.  Houston trailed early in the first quarter as Raiders quarterback JaMarcus Russell completed a 20-yard touchdown pass to wide receiver Chaz Schilens.  The Texans responded with fullback Vonta Leach's 1-yard touchdown run.  However, Oakland responded with kicker Sebastian Janikowski getting a 33-yard and a 30-yard field goal.  Houston tied the game in the second quarter as kicker Kris Brown got a 53-yard and a 24-yard field goal.

In the third quarter, the Raiders scored two unanswered touchdowns: wide receiver Johnnie Lee Higgins caught a 29-yard touchdown pass from Russell, followed by an 80-yard punt return for a touchdown.  The Texans tried to come back in the fourth quarter: Brown nailed a 40-yard field goal, but that was too little, too late.

With the loss, Houston fell to 7–8.

Week 17: vs. Chicago Bears

Hoping to end their season on a high note, the Texans closed out their season at home in a Week 17 interconference duel with the Chicago Bears.  Houston trailed early in the first quarter as Bears quarterback Kyle Orton completed a 4-yard touchdown pass to wide receiver Brandon Lloyd, followed by a 37-yard field goal from kicker Robbie Gould.  The Texans responded and took the lead as quarterback Matt Schaub a 43-yard and a 3-yard touchdown pass to wide receiver Andre Johnson.

In the third quarter, Houston added onto their lead with running back Ryan Moats scoring a touchdown on a 2-yard run.  Chicago answered with Orton completing a 1-yard touchdown pass to tight end Greg Olsen.  In the fourth quarter, the Texans pulled away as kicker Kris Brown nailed a 22-yard field goal, followed by rookie running back Steve Slaton's 2-yard touchdown run.  The Bears tried to come back as Orton got a 1-yard touchdown run, but Houston's defense stiffened for the victory.

With the win, the Texans closed out their season at 8–8.

Statistics

Team

Individual

Source:

Notes

References

External links
 Official Website
 Houston Texans Team Page

Houston Texans seasons
Houston